The 1903 Texas A&M Aggies football team represented the Agricultural and Mechanical College of Texas—now known as Texas A&M University as an independent during the 1903 college football season. Led by second-year head coach J. E. Platt, the Aggies compiled a record of 7–3–1.

Schedule

References

Texas AandM
Texas A&M Aggies football seasons
Texas AandM Aggies football